The Tomas Gonzales House, near Abiquiu, New Mexico, United States, was built in 1895.  It was listed on the National Register of Historic Places in 1996.  It has also been known as Mormon House and as Goad Place.

It is a two-story building constructed of baked adobe bricks.

References

I-houses in New Mexico
National Register of Historic Places in Rio Arriba County, New Mexico
Houses completed in 1895